Stille Volk (meaning "The Silent People" in Dutch and German) is a folk band from the Pyrenees area of France. The band formed in 1994, and draws inspiration from Celtic and medieval music.

The members play mostly, sometimes exclusively, traditional instruments (except on the more experimental album Ex-uvies). The lyrics are usually sung in French, Catalan or Occitan, and are mostly pagan-themed, evoking nature, myths, magical beings and sorcery. The band members identify with a form of paganism they define as a nature-based aesthetic and having a subjective view of the world; they reject organised religion and political interpretations of paganism.

The band is sometimes associated with the folk metal genre, probably due to the use of electric guitars on the Ex-uvies album. The other albums, however, are not related to this genre in any way. It is notable, though, that the two members of Stille Volk play together in a folk metal band called Hantaoma, highly reminiscent of Stille Volk.

The name "Stille Volk" comes from "Encyclopedia of Elves" by Pierre Dubois where it was a name for "troglodyte elves [i.e. dwarves] from German mythology". The phrase "Stille Volk" is ungrammatical in German.

Members

Current members
 Patrick Lafforgue – vocals, wind instruments
 Patrice Roques – string instruments, choirs
 Arexis – percussion
 Sarg – string guitar, bagpipe, choirs (live)

Former members
 Fred Neheride – drums

Instruments
 Arab lute
 Bagpipes
 Bombarde
 Bouzouki
 Dulcimer
 Drum machine
 Flute
 Guimbarde
 Guitar
 Horn
 Hurdy-gurdy
 Mandolin
 Nyckelharpa
 Portable organ
 Psaltery
 String tambourine
 Violin

Discography
 Hantaoma - 1997, Holy Records
 Ex-uvies - 1998, Holy Records
 Satyre Cornu - 2001, Holy Records
 Maudat - 2002, Holy Records
 Nueit De Sabbat - 2009, Holy Records
 Pèira Negra - 2014, Holy Records
Milharis - 2019, Prophecy Productions

See also
 Hantaoma is a folk metal band named after the first Stille Volk album featuring Patrick Lafforgue and Patrice Roques. Their debut album, Malombra, was released in 2005. The lyrics are sung entirely in Occitan.
 Sus Scrofa is a folk metal band co-founded by Arexis & Patrick Lafforgue. The band was formed in 1991, and split in 1994. The band reunited in 2015.

References

External links

 Official Stille Volk website
 Holy Records

French folk music groups
Modern pagan musical groups
Modern paganism in France